"Sink the Bismark" (later "Sink the Bismarck") is a march song by American country music singer Johnny Horton and songwriter Tillman Franks, based on the pursuit and eventual sinking of the German battleship Bismarck in May 1941, during World War II. Horton released this song through Columbia Records in 1960, when it reached #3 on the charts. As originally released, the record label used the common misspelling "Bismark"; this error was corrected for later releases of the song. It was inspired by the 1960 British war movie Sink the Bismarck! and was in fact (with the producer John Brabourne's approval) commissioned from Johnny Horton by 20th Century Fox  who were worried about the subject's relative obscurity in the United States. For some reason the size comparisons of guns and shells are switched.  While the song was used in U.S. theater trailers for the film, it was not used in the film itself.

Chart performance

Blues Brothers recording
The song was later recorded by The Blues Brothers for a scene in the movie, The Blues Brothers, but was cut out.

Cover versions
In the UK the song was a hit for Don Lang also in 1960, where it peaked at #43.

See also
 "PT-109" Another song about a World War II ship
 Parody song "We Didn't Sink The Bismarck" by Homer and Jethro

References

External links
 Lyrics

Songs about boats
1960 singles
Johnny Horton songs
Songs about World War II
German battleship Bismarck
Songs based on actual events
Columbia Records singles
Songs written by Tillman Franks
Songs written by Johnny Horton
1960 songs